Corey Robinson may refer to:

Corey Robinson (offensive tackle) (born 1992), American football offensive tackle for the Jacksonville Jaguars
Corey Robinson (quarterback) (born 1990), American football quarterback for Troy
Corey Robinson (wide receiver) (born 1995), American football wide receiver for Notre Dame
Corey Parker Robinson (born 1975), American actor